Patrilineality, also known as the male line, the spear side or agnatic kinship, is a common kinship system in which an individual's family membership derives from and is recorded through their father's lineage. It generally involves the inheritance of property, rights, names, or titles by persons related through male kin. This is sometimes distinguished from cognate  kinship, through the mother's lineage, also called the spindle side or the distaff side.

A patriline ("father line") is a person's father, and additional ancestors, as traced only through males.

Traditionally and historically people would identify the person's ethnicity with the father's heritage and ignore the maternal ancestry in the ethnic factor.

In the Bible
In the Bible, family and tribal membership appears to be transmitted through the father. For example, a person is considered to be a priest or Levite, if his father is a priest or Levite, and the members of all the Twelve Tribes are called Israelites because their father is Israel (Jacob). Because of this they are called the "chosen people" by virtue of being "sons of Israel"; that is, the biological male descendants of Israel, who is referred to as their "father" in the sense that he is their lineal male ancestor.

Agnatic succession
Patrilineal or agnatic succession gives priority to or restricts inheritance of a throne or fief to heirs, male or female, descended from the original title holder through males only. Traditionally, agnatic succession is applied in determining the names and membership of European dynasties. The prevalent forms of dynastic succession in Europe, Asia and parts of Africa were male-preference primogeniture, agnatic primogeniture, or agnatic seniority until after World War II.  There are, however, matrilineal examples like the Lobedu Rain Queen.

By the 21st century, most ongoing European monarchies had replaced their traditional agnatic succession with absolute primogeniture, meaning that the first child born to a monarch inherits the throne, regardless of the child's sex.

Salic law
Variations of Salic law, generally understood in modern times to mean exclusion of women as hereditary monarchs, restricted succession to thrones and inheritance of fiefs or land to men in parts of medieval and later Europe. Once common, strict Salic inheritance has been officially revoked in all extant European monarchies except the Principality of Liechtenstein.

Exception for the enslaved in the United States
In the United States, the offspring of enslaved women inherited their mother's status. A significant consequence of this is that children resulting from rape or unions between enslaved women and their owners did not have any of the rights of the father as they would have had under the patrilineal succession that applied to everyone but the enslaved.

Genetic genealogy

The fact that human Y-chromosome DNA (Y-DNA) is paternally inherited enables patrilines and agnatic kinships of men to be traced through genetic analysis.

Y-chromosomal Adam (Y-MRCA) is the patrilineal most recent common ancestor from whom all Y-DNA in living men is descended. An identification of a very rare and previously unknown Y-chromosome variant in 2012 led researchers to estimate that Y-chromosomal Adam lived 338,000 years ago (237,000 to 581,000 years ago with 95% confidence), judging from molecular clock and genetic marker studies. Before this discovery, estimates of the date when Y-chromosomal Adam lived were much more recent, estimated to be tens of thousands of years.

See also
 Agnatic seniority
 Derbfine
 Family name
 Historical inheritance systems
 Hypodescent
 Hyperdescent
 Matrilineality
 Matriname
 Order of succession
 Patricide
 Patrilocal residence
 Primogeniture
 Royal and noble ranks
 Y chromosome

References

External links 

Kinship and descent
Patriarchy
Order of succession